Guanine nucleotide-binding protein subunit alpha-12 is a protein that in humans is encoded by the GNA12 gene.

Interactions and functions 

The GNA12 gene encodes the G12 G protein alpha subunit. Together with GNA13, these two proteins comprise one of the four classes of heterotrimeric G protein alpha subunits. Heterotrimeric G proteins function in transducing hormone and neurotransmitter signals detected by cell surface G protein-coupled receptors to intracellular signaling pathways to modulate cell functions. G protein alpha subunits bind to guanine nucleotides and function in a regulatory cycle, and are active when bound to GTP but inactive and associated with the G beta-gamma complex when bound to GDP.

Active GTP-bound G12 alpha subunit interacts with and activates ARHGEF1, ARHGEF11, and ARHGEF12. These ARHGEF proteins function as guanine nucleotide exchange factors for the Rho small GTPases to regulate the actin cytoskeleton.

GNA12 also interacts with PPP5C, HSP90, Resistance to inhibitors of cholinesterase-8A (Ric-8A) and TEC.

See also 
 G12/G13 alpha subunits
 G protein-coupled receptor
 Heterotrimeric G protein
 Rho family of GTPases

References

External links